The D-Block Boys, also known as  "DBG," or "Dipset", is an African-American drug ring operating in Algiers, New Orleans,Louisiana. The gang have been involved in all criminal activity including drug-trafficking and murder. According to NOPD, The "D-Block Gang" has a history of violations, along with involvement in violent crimes.
This gang is not to be confused with the Dumaine Street Gang operating out of the 6th Ward of New Orleans, which is also called D'Block.

Overview
The gang formed in the Algiers neighborhood by teenagers who lived in the  DeGaulle Manor Public Housing Complex, and the Fischer Projects. The name deprived from the apartments which was nicknamed "D-Block." The D-Block clique have been tied to several homicides, most where between 2005-2007. NOPD's Fourth District police have been tracking the gang since the Mid-2000s as they distributed Heroin and Cocaine out of abandoned units in the DeGaulle Manor apartments, the base of there operation. Investagators stated the D-Block gang had access to high-powered assault rifles in which they used in deadly conflicts whith rival drug organizations. NOPD linked the gang to 9 homicides in the Algiers area and 5 in Jefferson Parish from 2004-2006.
In 2011 the Federal Bureau of Investigation listed the gang as a threat.
In 2017, three members was arrested on Westpark Ct in a raid for possession of a firearm while in possession of illegal narcotics, felon in possession of a firearm, possession of a stolen firearm and possession with the intent to distribute heroin and marijuana. During the search, detectives confiscated multiple firearms, 31 individually wrapped clear bags of a white powder substance later determined to be heroin, 36 individually wrapped clear bags of marijuana, cash and other items.

2006 Investigation 
The events leading up to the investigation began in the summer of 2005. NOPD linked the gruesome slaying of two Avondale cousins to the D-Block gang.The decomposed bodies was discovered on May 8th in DeGaulle Manor, inside the trunk of a car. Both men were tied up with gunshot wounds to the head. Homicide detectives didn't have enough phyisical evidence to charge them. In July, three members; Jamal Brooks, Hyran Brooks and Nicholas Wix were charged with first-degree murder for another double homicide, which took place on June 27th. The slayings in June was that of a man and women. According to authorities, the two were killed inside there home in the 1600 block of Murl Street after being sprayed with more than 20 bullets. Police confirmed They were not the intended targets for the hit. 
 March 2006, police arrested members; Jerome Gray and Cornell Williams in DeGaulle Manor for allegedly shooting assault rifles in the courtyard. The weapons would be traced to the April 26 shooting in the 2300 block of Murl Street.
 April of 2006, NOPD Fourth District linked Bryan Thomas as the fourth suspect to the June 27th double homicide. 
 July 2006, NOPD arrested five D-Block members in the Fischer Projects. Anthony "Nut" Thomas who was suspected of the April 26 shooting, had an active warrant out. SWAT team raided the complex and found the group in the courtyard. One of them was in possession of an SKS rifle. All five men were arrested. Thomas, who had a pending warrants, was booked with two counts of illegally carrying a weapon, possession of obliterated serial number, drug possession and resisting an officer.

See also
List of New Orleans gangs

References

2000s establishments in Louisiana
African-American gangs
Gangs in New Orleans
Organizations established in the 2000s
Organized crime in Louisiana